Tunay na Buhay is a Philippine television documentary show broadcast by GMA Network, GMA News TV and GTV. Originally hosted by Rhea Santos, it premiered on January 21, 2011 replacing OFW Diaries on the network's evening line up. The show concluded on GMA Network on July 15, 2020. The show moved to GMA News TV on August 5, 2020 on the network's Power Block line up. Pia Arcangel currently serves as the host. The show returned to GMA Network on January 6, 2021. The show concluded on January 12, 2022.

Hosts
 Rhea Santos 
 Pia Arcangel 

Guest host
 Susan Enriquez

Production
In March 2020, production was halted due to the enhanced community quarantine in Luzon caused by the COVID-19 pandemic. The show resumed its programming on August 5, 2020.

Ratings
According to AGB Nielsen Philippines' Mega Manila People/Individual television ratings, the pilot episode of Tunay na Buhay earned a 2.5% rating.

Accolades

References

External links
 
 

2011 Philippine television series debuts
2022 Philippine television series endings
Filipino-language television shows
GMA Network original programming
GMA Integrated News and Public Affairs shows
GMA News TV original programming
Philippine documentary television series
Television productions suspended due to the COVID-19 pandemic